Calamaria bicolor is a species of snake of the family Colubridae. Its vernacular names are two-colored dwarf snake and 	bicoloured reed snake.

Geographic range
The snake appears to be endemic to Borneo where it is widespread, being found in Kalimantan (Indonesia), Sabah, and Sarawak (Malaysia). Its presence in Java is uncertain.

References 

Calamaria
Endemic fauna of Borneo
Reptiles of Indonesia
Reptiles of Malaysia
Taxa named by Gabriel Bibron
Taxa named by André Marie Constant Duméril
Taxa named by Auguste Duméril
Reptiles described in 1854
Reptiles of Borneo